Andrea Boldrini (born 10 July 1971 in Milan) is an Italian racing driver. He has competed in such series as International Formula 3000, Formula Nippon, Porsche Supercup and the FIA GT Championship. He won the Italian Formula Three Championship in 1996.

External links
 Official website
 

1971 births
Living people
Racing drivers from Milan
Italian Formula Three Championship drivers
Formula Nippon drivers
FIA GT Championship drivers
International Formula 3000 drivers
Porsche Supercup drivers